The Ratmalana Polling Division is a Polling Division in the Colombo Electoral District, in the Western Province, Sri Lanka.

Presidential Election Results

Summary 

The winner of Ratmalana has matched the final country result 8 out of 8 times. Hence, Ratmalana is a Perfect Bellwether for Presidential Elections.

2019 Sri Lankan Presidential Election

2015 Sri Lankan Presidential Election

2010 Sri Lankan Presidential Election

2005 Sri Lankan Presidential Election

1999 Sri Lankan Presidential Election

1994 Sri Lankan Presidential Election

1988 Sri Lankan Presidential Election

1982 Sri Lankan Presidential Election

Parliamentary Election Results

Summary 

The winner of Ratmalana has matched the final country result 6 out of 7 times. Hence, Ratmalana is a Strong Bellwether for Parliamentary Elections.

2020 Sri Lankan Parliamentary Election

2015 Sri Lankan Parliamentary Election

2010 Sri Lankan Parliamentary Election

2004 Sri Lankan Parliamentary Election

2001 Sri Lankan Parliamentary Election

2000 Sri Lankan Parliamentary Election

1994 Sri Lankan Parliamentary Election

1989 Sri Lankan Parliamentary Election

Demographics

Ethnicity 

The Ratmalana Polling Division has a Sinhalese majority (78.9%) . In comparison, the Colombo Electoral District (which contains the Ratmalana Polling Division) has a Sinhalese majority (76.5%), a significant Moor population (10.7%) and a significant Sri Lankan Tamil population (10.1%)

Religion 

The Ratmalana Polling Division has a Buddhist majority (70.0%) and a significant Muslim population (11.3%) . In comparison, the Colombo Electoral District (which contains the Ratmalana Polling Division) has a Buddhist majority (70.2%) and a significant Muslim population (11.8%)

References 

Polling Divisions of the Colombo Electoral District